The Bonneville Salt Flats are a densely packed salt pan in Tooele County in northwestern Utah. A remnant of the Pleistocene Lake Bonneville, it is the largest of many salt flats west of the Great Salt Lake. It is public land managed by the Bureau of Land Management and is known for land speed records at the Bonneville Speedway. Access to the Flats is open to the public.

The Flats are about 12 miles (19 km) long and 5 miles (8 km) wide, with a crust almost 5 ft (1.5m) thick at the center and less than one inch (2.5 cm) towards the edges. It is estimated to hold 147 million tons of salt, approximately 90% of which is common table salt.

History

Geologist Grove Karl Gilbert named the area after Benjamin Bonneville, a U.S. Army officer who explored the Intermountain West in the 1830s. In 1907, Bill Rishel and two local businessmen tested the suitability of the salt for driving by taking a Pierce-Arrow onto its surface.

A railway line across the Flats was completed in 1910, marking the first permanent crossing. The first land speed record was set there in 1914 by Teddy Tetzlaff.

Entertainment filmed at the Flats include portions of Walking with Dinosaurs Special - The Ballad of Big Al, Knight Rider, Warlock, Independence Day (1996) and its sequel, SLC Punk, Cremaster 2 from Cremaster Cycle, The Brown Bunny, The World's Fastest Indian, Gerry, The Tree of Life, Top Gear and Pirates of the Caribbean: At World's End. Furthermore, the Pontiac Bonneville (former flagship sedan of the Pontiac motor division), the Triumph Bonneville motorcycle, and the Bonneville International media company are all named for the Flats.

The Bonneville Salt Flats hosts the annual US Flight Archery Championships. The goal of flight archery is to shoot arrows from bows at the greatest distance possible without regard to hitting a target, and so the vast flat plane of the flats serves as an ideal location to measure the linear distance traveled by arrows without geographic interference. Both the 1977 (archer Don Brown) and 1982 (archer Alan Webster) world records were set there; while the current world record, achieved in 1987 (archer Don Brown), was set at the salt flats near Smith Creek, Nevada.

Environmental concerns

The thickness of salt crust is a critical factor in racing use of the salt flats. The Bureau of Land Management (BLM) has undertaken multiple studies on the topic; while a 2007 study determined that there was little change in the crust's thickness from 1988 to 2003, more recent studies have shown a reduction in thickness, especially in the northwest area where racing occurs. 

The flats' overall area has contracted significantly over the past several decades. The cause or causes of this remain unclear, but many believe adjacent evaporative potash mining is the primary factor.

Collaboration between racing organizations, the potash mine, and the BLM led to a pilot program begun in 1998 to release excess brine onto the salt flats during winter. Plans to increase the volume of brine returned to the salt flats are hoped to halt loss of crust thickness, or possibly restore it where it has become too thin to sustain human use.

Land speed events

Motorcar racing has taken place at the salt flats since 1914. Racing takes place at part of the Bonneville Salt Flats known as the Bonneville Speedway. There are five major land speed events that take place at the Bonneville Salt Flats. Bonneville "Speed Week" takes place mid-August followed by "World of Speed" in September and the "World Finals" take place early October.

These three events welcome cars, trucks, and motorcycles. The "Bub Motorcycle Speed Trials" are for motorcycles only. World records are contested at the Mike Cook ShootOut in September. The Southern California Timing Association and the Utah Salt Flats Racing Association organizes and plans the multi-vehicle events, but all event promoters contribute to prepping and maintaining the salt. "Speed Week" events in August were canceled in 2015 and 2022, due to the poor condition of the salt in certain parts of the flats. The salt flats had been swamped by heavy rains earlier in the year, as usual, but this year the rains also triggered mudslides from surrounding mountains onto a section of the flats used for the land-speed racing courses.

Stardust
In 2004, the Stardust spacecraft released its sample-return capsule for a landing in the Bonneville Salt Flats after its flybys of asteroid 5535 Annefrank in 2002 and comet Wild 2 in 2004.

See also
 Pontiac Bonneville, a car that was named after the salt flats
 Triumph Bonneville, a motorcycle that was named after the salt flats
 Black Rock Desert in Nevada, another land-speed record test ground
 List of vehicle speed records

References

External links

 Bonneville Salt Flats Special Recreation Management Area - Bureau of Land Management
 Bonneville Salt Flats – (Internet Archive)
 FIA World Land Speed Records
 US Flight Archery

Deserts of Utah
Great Salt Lake Desert
Salt flats of the United States
Landforms of Tooele County, Utah
Geography of Tooele County, Utah
Bureau of Land Management areas in Utah
Protected areas of Tooele County, Utah